Asimenye Simwaka (born 8 August 1997) is a Malawian athlete and footballer who plays as a forward for the Malawi women's national team.

Athletics career
Simwaka competed at the 2020 Summer Olympics in Tokyo, being the lone Malawian track and field athlete to do so. After breaking the Malawian national record in the preliminary heats of women's 100 meters, she became the national record holder in the 100, 200 and 400 meters at the same time. She improved on her national record in the following heats, running 11.68 but did not qualify for the semi-finals.

Personal Bests

Football career

Club career
Simwaka has played for Topik in Malawi.

International career
Simwaka capped for Malawi at senior level during three COSAFA Women's Championship editions (2019, 2020 and 2021).

References

1997 births
Living people
Olympic athletes of Malawi
Malawian female sprinters
Athletes (track and field) at the 2020 Summer Olympics
Malawian women's footballers
Women's association football forwards
Malawi women's international footballers
Olympic female sprinters